Keshav Prakash is an Indian cinematographer, film producer and wine connoisseur. After beginning his career as cinematographer through films such as Bollywood Calling (2001) and Virumaandi (2004), Keshav has prioritised his business ventures since 2011.

Career 
After studying filmmaking in Maine, Keshav Prakash apprenticed under cinematographer Ravi K. Chandran during the making of Kamal Haasan's Marudhanayagam in 1998. Despite beginning production, the film was later stalled. Keshav later worked on Kamal Haasan's first directorial release, Virumaandi (2004), and won critical acclaim for his work. A critic wrote Keshav Prakash's "cinematography alternates between documentary rawness and dramatic richness". Kamal Haasan and Keshav had initially attempted to make the film in high definition during 2003, but later had to abandon the idea owing to technical problems.

Keshav later worked as the cinematographer of an experimental English film titled The President Is Coming (2009), which he shot using a digital camera. He then worked on Aao Wish Karein (2009), shot largely in Shimla and Manali. For the film, the team had to innovate to showcase a balance of artificial and natural light in a difficult location.

In the early 2010s, he set up The Oak League - an underground whisky appreciation society - as well as The Vault, a Mumbai-based boutique that curates a selection of fine spirits and whiskies from around the world. He was inducted as a life member of Keepers of The Quaich in October 2017, and as a member of The Gin Guild in October 2018.

Filmography 
As lead cinematographer

Other film credits
Sex and the Other Man (1995) (camera production assistant)
The Highest Pass (2011) (documentary; second camera operator)
Fire in the Blood (2013) (documentary; director of photography - India)
Hector and the Search for Happiness (2014) (director of photography - India)
Nachom-ia Kumpasar (2015) (co-producer; additional photography)

References

External links 
 

Living people
Hindi film cinematographers
Tamil film cinematographers
21st-century Indian photographers
Oenologists
Sommeliers
Wine merchants
Year of birth missing (living people)